The 2020 Union Omaha season was the first season in the soccer team's history, where they competed in the third division of American soccer, USL League One, the second season of that competition. Union Omaha played their home games at Werner Park, located in Papillion, Nebraska, United States.  Union Omaha finished the regular season in second place to qualify for the USL League One final to take place against Greenville Triumph, however the game was canceled due to an outbreak of COVID-19 on the Union Omaha roster.  Greenville were awarded the title as a result of finishing with the highest points per game average during the regular season.

Roster

Competitions

Exhibitions

USL League One

Standings

Results summary

Results by round

Match results

Playoff Final

Note: Game was cancelled after several players tested positive for COVID-19. Greenville was awarded the title based on points per game average (2.188 to 1.825).

Statistics

Appearances and goals

Numbers after plus–sign (+) denote appearances as a substitute.

References

Union Omaha
Union Omaha
Union Omaha